E. W. Montgomery Cotton Warehouse, also known as the Greenville Bonded Cotton Warehouse and now the Elements West Apartments, is a historic cotton warehouse located in Greenville, South Carolina. The original section was built about 1928. Following the property's purchase in 1933 by Edmund Warren Montgomery, a significant cotton merchant and broker in upstate South Carolina from the early-to-mid-20th century, three additions were completed.  The two-story, brick building measures 553 feet long and 60 feet deep, and has 68,000 square feet in seven bays.

It was added to the National Register of Historic Places in 2012.

References

Industrial buildings and structures on the National Register of Historic Places in South Carolina
Industrial buildings completed in 1933
National Register of Historic Places in Greenville, South Carolina
Warehouses on the National Register of Historic Places
Cotton industry in the United States
Apartment buildings in South Carolina